The 2011 English cricket season was the 112th in which the County Championship had been an official competition. It began on 2 April with a round of university matches, and continued until the final of the Clydesdale Bank 40 on 17 September. Three major domestic competitions were contested: the 2011 County Championship won by Lancashire, the 2011 Clydesdale Bank 40 won by Surrey and the 2011 Friends Life t20 won by Leicestershire.

During this season, two Test teams toured England: Sri Lanka lost both the Test series (1–0) and the One Day International (ODI) series (3–2), but won the solitary Twenty20 International (T20I). India also toured, losing to England in four Tests.  Five ODIs were played, England winning 3–0 with one tie and one no result.  England also won the single T20I match.

Roll of honour
Test series
 England v Sri Lanka: 3 Tests – England won 1–0.
 England v India: 4 Tests – England won 4–0.

ODI series
 England v Sri Lanka: 5 ODIs – England won 3–2.
 England in Ireland: Only ODI – England won by 11 runs.
 England v India: 5 ODIs – England won 3–0.

Twenty20 International series
 England v Sri Lanka: Only T20I – Sri Lanka won by 9 wickets.
 England v India: Only T20I – England won by 6 wickets.
 England v West Indies: 2 T20Is – Series drawn 1-1

County Championship
 Division One winners: Lancashire
 Division Two winners: Middlesex
 Relegated from Division One: Yorkshire and Hampshire
 Promoted from Division Two: Middlesex and Surrey

Clydesdale Bank 40 (CB40)
 Winners: Surrey Lions
 Runners-up: Somerset

Friends Life t20
 Winners: Leicestershire Foxes
 Runners-up: Somerset

Minor Counties Championship 
 Winners: Devon

MCCA Knockout Trophy
 Winners: Berkshire

Second XI Championship
 Winners: Warwickshire II

Second XI Trophy
 Winners: Nottinghamshire II

Wisden Cricketers of the Year
 Tamim Iqbal, Eoin Morgan, Chris Read, Jonathan Trott, Not awarded

PCA Player of the Year
 Marcus Trescothick

PCA Most Valuable Player of the Year
 Marcus Trescothick

County Championship

Divisions

Division One Standings
 Pld = Played, W = Wins, L = Losses, D = Draws, T = Ties, A = Abandonments, Bat = Batting points, Bowl = Bowling points, Ded = Deducted points, Pts = Points.

Division Two Standings
 Pld = Played, W = Wins, L = Losses, D = Draws, T = Ties, A = Abandonments, Bat = Batting points, Bowl = Bowling points, Ded = Deducted points, Pts = Points.

Clydesdale Bank 40

Group stage

Group A

Group B

Group C

Knockout stage

Friends Life t20

Group stage

North Group

South Group

 The Hampshire Royals began the tournament on minus two points for a poor pitch from last season.

Knockout stage

See also
Sri Lankan cricket team in England in 2011
Indian cricket team in England in 2011

References

 2011
 
2011 in cricket
Cricket season